Arthur Broughton Sykes (16 June 1897 – 1978) was an English professional footballer who played as a winger.

References

1897 births
1978 deaths
Footballers from Grimsby
English footballers
Association football wingers
Grimsby Rovers F.C. players
Grimsby Town F.C. players
Louth Town F.C. players
English Football League players